, formerly known as , is an annual Manzai competition planned by Shinsuke Shimada and run by Yoshimoto Kogyo.  The supporter Asahi Broadcasting Corporation broadcasts live throughout Japan via All-Nippon News Network.

 it is the most prevalent manzai competition in Japan. The grand prix ended in 2010 and was brought back in 2015 with sponsors including Cygames, Nissin Foods, FamilyMart, Suntory and Uniqlo.

The way to be the Champion
Before 2010, to qualify as a contestant, the unit must have a career age of 10 years or under. When the competition was brought back in 2015, this limit was changed to 15 years or under. Other than this condition, anyone can enter the competition and reach the televised semifinals and finals if they pass through.

Contestants must go through 5 rounds of elimination before moving to the televised finals, where only 8 units are selected from the semifinals to become finalists. The second chance round was introduced in the 2nd Grand Prix and allows for semi finalists to compete in an additional round competing for an addition spot as the second chance winners in the finals. From 2017 and onward, the total number of finalists increased to 9, plus an additional second chance winner.

The finalists does a lottery draw to determine the entrance order, and are given points out of 100 by each of the judges. After all contestants have performed and points are given, the top 3 units with the highest points advanced to perform a second time at the grand finals. The judges then do a final vote to crown the winner.

Locations 

Preliminary (Round 1, Round 2, Round 3, Quarterfinal, Semifinal)
from August or September until December
Round 1 (2001): Sapporo, Sendai, Tokyo, Hamamatsu, Nagoya, Osaka, Takamatsu, Hiroshima, Fukuoka
Round 1 (2002): Sapporo, Sendai, Tokyo, Yokohama, Nagoya, Osaka, Hiroshima, Fukuoka
Round 1 (2003-2009): Sapporo, Sendai, Tokyo, Nagoya, Osaka, Hiroshima, Fukuoka
Round 1 (2010): Sapporo, Sendai, Tokyo, Niigata, Nagoya, Osaka, Hiroshima, Matsuyama, Fukuoka
Round 2, Round 3, Semifinal (-2009), Quarterfinal (2010): Tokyo, Osaka 
Semifinal (2010): Tokyo (Ryōgoku Kokugikan)
Second Chance Consolation (2002-2010)
from noon until 5 p.m. on the day of the finals
aired on Sky A Sports Plus, a satellite broadcasting company owned by ABC (2004-2010)
The winner of the Second Chance Consolation gets a second chance as the final contestant at the M-1 finals
2002-2004: special floor in front of Panasonic Center Tokyo
2005: Meiji Jingu Stadium
2006: Ariake Coliseum
2007-2010: Ohi Racecourse
the Finals
live on TV (All-Nippon News Network, cast nation-wide)
2001: Lemon Studio
2002-2004: Panasonic Center Ariake Studio
2005-2010: TV Asahi Headquarters Studio 1

Winners 

Under Final Votes, bold means it was a unanimous victory, all 7 judges voted for that unit as the winner.

Winner's prize 
Winner's prize ¥10,000,000
Winner's trophy
Additional prizes Until 2010
Gift certificates of Car supplies courtesy of Autobacs Seven
The right to appear CM of Autobacs Seven
Additional prizes for 2015
Vacation to Palau courtesy of Cygames
Champion jacket and commercial deal courtesy of Uniqlo
10 years worth of Donbei cup noodles courtesy of Nissin Foods
1000 pieces of Family Mart Premium fried chicken courtesy of FamilyMart
Additional prizes for 2016
Vacation to Hawaii courtesy of Cygames
Commercial deal for M-1 no don courtesy of Nissin Foods
100 kg of FamilyMart Premium fried chicken courtesy of FamilyMart
1 year worth of The Premium Malts beer courtesy of Suntory
Additional prizes for 2017
Luxury vacation to Hawaii courtesy of Cygames
T Point Card with points to redeem 1 year worth of Donbei cup noodles and FamilyMart Premium fried chicken courtesy of Nissin Foods and FamilyMart
1 year worth of Strong Zero alcoholic beverage courtesy of Suntory
Additional prizes for 2018
Tickets for Serie A match with Juventus FC in Turin, Italy courtesy of Cygames
100 kg of FamilyMart Premium fried chicken courtesy of FamilyMart
1 year worth of Strong Zero alcoholic beverage courtesy of Suntory
Chianina beef from Italy with 1 meal worth of Donbei cup noodles courtesy of Nissin Foods
Additional prizes for 2019
Journey to Dubai courtesy of Cygames
1 year worth of Strong Zero alcoholic beverage courtesy of Suntory
Considering the same amount of money as the other three companies from Nissin Foods → 5 years worth of NISSIN FOODS products
1 year worth of FamilyMart Premium fried chicken courtesy of FamilyMart
Additional prizes for 2020
1 head saga beef worth courtesy of Cygames
1 year worth of New Strong Zero Etc. chu-hi alcoholic beverage courtesy of Suntory
Victory Memorial Statue courtesy of Nissin Foods
1 year worth of FamilyMart Premium fried chicken and Teriyaki roast chicken leg courtesy of FamilyMart
Additional prizes for 2021
1 head saga beef worth courtesy of Cygames
1 year worth of Strong Zero Etc. chu-hi alcoholic beverage courtesy of Suntory
1 year worth of Gold series four-piece set（Golden Hamburg syteak, golden shrimp sause, Golden Beef Curry, Golden Beef Stew） courtesy of 7-Eleven
Leading role for Festive sale &1 year worth of Donbei cup noodles courtesy of Nissin Foods
Additional prizes for 2022
1 head saga beef worth courtesy of Cygames
Great mug for party courtesy of Suntory
The same amount of Points earned by the new champion in the finals worth of Gold series courtesy of 7-Eleven
The right to use a helicopter only once between Tokyo and Osaka &1 year worth of Donbei cup noodles courtesy of Nissin Foods

Historic Results
The affiliated agency listed is the unit's agency at the time of the competition

1st M-1 Grand Prix (2001)

 The 7 judges are: Shinsuke Shimada, Hitoshi Matsumoto, Shoji Kokami, LaSalle Ishii, Koasa Shunpūtei, Yukio Aoshima, Kiyoshi Nishikawa
 The 3 audience judges are from the cities of: Sapporo, Osaka, Fukuoka

Notes

 Matsumoto gave King Kong a score of 55 while Nishikawa gave them a score of 95, causing a 40-point difference, which is the largest point difference for a single participant
 Nakagawake are the only winners with the first entrance order
 Four of the finalists this year are winners or would go on to become winners in later years, the most ever (Nakagawake, Masuda Okada, Football Hour and Tutorial)

2nd M-1 Grand Prix (2002) 

 The 7 judges are: Shinsuke Shimada, Hitoshi Matsumoto, Makoto Otake, LaSalle Ishii, Yōshichi Shimada, Kausu Nakada, Danshi Tatekawa

Notes

 The Second Chance or Consolation Round was introduced this year
 The only year where there were more finalists who are not affiliated with Yoshimoto than those who are (5 to 4)
 All 3 units in the grand finals became winners in future years

3rd M-1 Grand Prix (2003) 

 The 7 judges are: Shinsuke Shimada, Hitoshi Matsumoto, Kiyotaka Nanbara, Yōshichi Shimada, LaSalle Ishii, Makoto Otake, Kausu Nakada

Notes

 The restrictions for participation changed from less than 10 years since formation to less than or equals to 10 years since formation
 From this year and forward, judge points became more consistent in the range of the 70s as low and 90s are high
 All 3 units in the grand finals became winners in future years
 Koji Imada was appointed the MC from this year and onward

4th M-1 Grand Prix (2004) 

 The 7 judges are: Kiyoshi Nishikawa, Kiyotaka Nanbara, Makoto Otake, Yoshichi Shimada, Koasa Shunpūtei, LaSalle Ishii, Kausu Nakada

Notes

 Untouchable holds the record for the single highest points attained with 673 points, all judges had given more than 95 points
 The point difference between the 1st place and 2nd place between Untouchable and Nankai Candies are the largest ever at 34 points
 Although Taka and Toshi and Waraimeshi scored the same number of points, the judges determined that Taka and Toshi was better and placed above Waraimeshi

5th M-1 Grand Prix (2005) 

 The 7 judges are: Shinsuke Shimada, Hitoshi Matsumoto, Masayuki Watanabe, Makoto Otake, Yoshichi Shimada, LaSalle Ishii, Kausu Nakada

Notes

 The finals location was moved to TV Asahi headquarters in Roppongi Hills from this year onward

6th M-1 Grand Prix (2006) 

 The 7 judges are: Shinsuke Shimada, Hitoshi Matsumoto, Kiyotaka Nanbara, Masayuki Watanabe, Yoshichi Otake, Kausu Nakada

Notes

 For the first and only time ever, amateurs (not signed with any agency or in the industry) made it to the finals (Henho Chouchou)
 For the first and only time ever, a unit of 5 people rather than the traditionally duo Manzai unit made it to the finals (The Plan 9)
 The only year where all finalists were affiliated with Yoshimoto, with the exception of Henho Chouchou who have no agency
 Tutorial are the first winners to win with unanimous votes, the other unanimous winner is Punk Boo Boo in 2009

7th M-1 Grand Prix (2007) 

 The 7 judges are: Shinsuke Shimada, Hitoshi Matsumoto, Emiko Kaminuma, LaSalle Ishii, All Kyojin, Makoto Otake, Kausu Nakada

Notes

 Sandwichman are the first winners to come from the second chance round, the other winner is Trendy Angel in 2015

8th M-1 Grand Prix (2008) 

 The 7 judges are: Shinsuke Shimada, Hitoshi Matsumoto, Emiko Kaminuma, Masayuki Watanabe, All Kyojin, Makoto Otake, Kaausu Nakada

Notes

 The only year where all 3 grand finalists had appeared for the 1st time ever as a finalist
 NON STYLE are the first winners that was formed post 2000
 Aya Ueto was appointed as the assistant MC from this year onward

9th M-1 Grand Prix (2009) 

 The 7 judges are: Shinsuke Shimada, Hitoshi Matsumoto, Emiko Kaminuma, Hideo Higashikokubaru, All Kyojin, Masayuki Watanabe, Kausu Nakada

Notes

 Punk Boo Boo became the second unanimous winner after Tutorial in 2006
 Punk Boo Boo won The Manzai 2011, just two years later as the only unit to win both competitions
 Waraimeshi received the highest points by a single judge ever with 100 points from Shinsuke Shimada

10th M-1 Grand Prix (2010) 

 The 7 judges are: Shinsuke Shimada, Hitoshi Matsumoto, Kiyotaka Nanbara, Kazuki Otake, Masayuki Watanabe, Hiroyuki Miyasako, Kausu Nakada

Notes

 Waraimeshi has been a finalist every single year since 2002, marking 9 consecutive years as the finalists and the most finals appearances ever
 This was the final M-1 Grand Prix before the 5-year hiatus

11th M-1 Grand Prix (2015) 

 This is the first M-1 Grand Prix in 5 years since 2010
 The 9 judges are all past winners of every M-1 Grand Prix except 2004:
 Reiji (Nakagawake), Hidehiko Masuda (Masuda Okada), Nozomu Iwao (Football Hour), Takashi Yoshida (Black Mayonnaise), Yoshimi Tokui (Tutorial), Takeshi Tomizawa (Sandwichman), Akira Ishida (Non Style), Tetsuo Sato (Punk Boo Boo), Tetsuo (Waraimeshi)

Notes

 Revived after 5 years since 2010
 Restrictions changed from within 10 years formed to within 15 years formed
 There are 9 judges in total and each judge is the past winner of every M-1 Grand Prix except 2004 (Untouchable)
 Trendy Angel are the second winners to come from the second chance round after Sandwichman in 2007
 All units at least received a 90 or above from a single judge

12th M-1 Grand Prix (2016) 

 The 5 judges are: Emiko Kaminuma, Hitoshi Matsumoto, Daikichi Hakata, Reiji (Nakagawake), All Kyojin

Notes

 Although units received the same number of points, their position is determined by the number of judges were higher points, for example Akina received higher points by 3 judges over Haraichi, which is the majority, marking them above Haraichi in placement
 The only time when the same unit entry number has made it to the finals in two consecutive years (Kaminari is entry number 73 this year, which was Wagyu's entry number last year)

13th M-1 Grand Prix (2017) 

 The 7 judges are: Emiko Kaminuma, Hitoshi Matsumoto, Daikichi Hakata, Koasa Shunputei, Reiji (Nakagawake), Masayuki Watanabe, All Kyojin

Notes

 From this year onward, there are 9 finalists and 1 second chance winner, for a total of 10 finalists, one more than past years
 For the first time, a unit were runners-up in consecutive years (Wagyu)
 It was determined from this year onward, that units with a same points will have the same placement regardless of point details

14th M-1 Grand Prix (2018) 

 The 7 judges are: Emiko Kaminuma, Hitoshi Matsumoto, Takeshi Tomizawa (Sandwich Man), Shiraku Tatekawa, Nobuyuki Hanawa (Knights), Reiji (Nakagawake), All Kyojin

Notes

 Shimofuri Myojo are the first winners that were born in the Heisei era and post 1990s, they were also the youngest winners ever at the age of 25 and 26
 Wagyu are the second unit to make it to top 3 in the finals 3 times in a row after Kirin, and are the only unit to be runners-up 3 times in a row

15th M-1 Grand Prix (2019) 

 The 7 judges are: Emiko Kaminuma, Hitoshi Matsumoto, Takeshi Tomizawa, Shiraku Tatekawa, Nobuyuki Hanawa, Reiji (Nakagawake), All Kyojin

Notes

 This is the first M-1 Grand Prix to take place in the Reiwa period and the last of the decade of 2010s
 With a total number of entrants at 5040, this is the first time there have been over 5000 total participants in the Grand Prix
For the first time, the judges are the same as last year
For the first time since the 8th M-1 Grand Prix (2008), a Manzai duo that is not affiliated with Yoshimoto makes it into the top 3 finals
The winner, Milk Boy's 681 points is the highest in the history of the Grand Prix, beating out Untouchable's previous record of 673

16th M-1 Grand Prix (2020) 

 The 7 judges are: Emiko Kaminuma, Hitoshi Matsumoto, Takeshi Tomizawa, Shiraku Tatekawa, Nobuyuki Hanawa, Reiji (Nakagawake), All Kyojin

Notes

 With a total number of entrants at 5081, this is the most entrants in the history of the grand prix
The judges are the same for the 3rd year in a row
The first grand prix where a unit of two solo comedians made it to the finals (Oideyasu Koga, unit of Oideyasu Oda and Kogaken)
The winner, Magical Lovely, placed last in the 2017 M-1 Grand Prix finals and won in their second appearance in 3 years, going from last to first

17th M-1 Grand Prix (2021) 

 The 7 judges are: Emiko Kaminuma, Hitoshi Matsumoto, Takeshi Tomizawa, Shiraku Tatekawa, Nobuyuki Hanawa, Reiji (Nakagawake), All Kyojin

Notes

From this year, the sponsor has changed from FamilyMart to 7-eleven
With a total number of entrants at 6017, this is the most entrants in the history of the grand prix
The judges are the same for the 4th year in a row
For the first time since the 7th M-1 Grand Prix (2007), a Manzai duo that is not affiliated with Yoshimoto makes it win

18th M-1 Grand Prix (2022) 

 The 7 judges are: Hitoshi Matsumoto, Reiji (Nakagawake), Shiraku Tatekawa, Takeshi Tomizawa, Nobuyuki Hanawa, Daikichi Hakata, Kuniko Yamada 

Notes

With a total number of entrants at 7261, this is the most entrants in the history of the grand prix

Masters of ceremony

Event hiatus 
On December 12, 2010, Yoshimoto Kogyo and ABC announced that "M-1 Grand Prix" would end in the year and they will start the project to succeed the event.

The event restarted in 2015 with different sponsors and is no longer officially titled "Autobacs M-1 Grand Prix", but simply ''M-1 Grand Prix''.

References

External links 
Official site

Performing arts in Japan
Japanese television specials
Comedy competitions